Gabriela Sabatini and Brenda Schultz-McCarthy were the defending champions but lost in the semifinals to Larisa Savchenko and Arantxa Sánchez Vicario.

Savchenko and Sánchez Vicario won in the final 7–6, 6–1 against Mary Joe Fernández and Helena Suková.

Seeds
Champion seeds are indicated in bold text while text in italics indicates the round in which those seeds were eliminated. The top four seeded teams received byes into the second round.

Draw

Final

Top half

Bottom half

External links
 1996 du Maurier Open women's doubles draw

Doubles
1996 du Maurier Open